Kevin Jobling (born 1 January 1968 in Sunderland) is an English former professional footballer who played in the Football League for Leicester City, Grimsby Town and Shrewsbury Town, and in non-league football for Telford United.

References

External links
 League stats at Neil Brown's site

1968 births
Living people
Footballers from Sunderland
English footballers
Association football fullbacks
Association football midfielders
Leicester City F.C. players
Grimsby Town F.C. players
Shrewsbury Town F.C. players
Telford United F.C. players
English Football League players